Get Down Tonight: The Disco Explosion was a 2004 musical documentary special which aired on PBS. The special featured Irene Cara, KC & The Sunshine Band, Yvonne Elliman, The Hues Corporation, Peaches & Herb, Karen Lynn Gorney, A Taste of Honey, Rob Parissi of Wild Cherry, Leo Sayer, Deney Terrio, Frankie Valli, Martha Wash, Barry Williams, Norma Jean Wright and Felton Pilate. It was directed by T.J. Lubinsky, and produced by Jerry Blavat, Henry J. DeLuca, Cousin Brucie Morrow and Lubinsky. One of the associate producers was Marty Angelo.

External links

American documentary television films
2000s American films